Roger Michael Chapman (born 1 May 1959) is an English professional golfer who played on the European Tour and later on the PGA Tour Champions. He now plays on the European Senior Tour. He won two senior majors in 2012, the Senior PGA Championship and the U.S. Senior Open.

Amateur career
Chapman was born in Nakuru, Kenya, where his father worked for the Ministry of Agriculture. After a spell living in Trinidad, the family returned to England when Chapman was about five years old. His biggest individual successes as an amateur were winning the 1979 English Amateur and the 1981 Lytham Trophy. He represented Great Britain & Ireland in the 1981 Walker Cup where, although the United States won the match 15–9, Chapman won three of his four matches. He beat Bob Lewis in first day's singles and then beat Hal Sutton twice on the final day, in both the foursomes and the singles.

Professional career
Chapman turned professional in late-1981 and won a European Tour card on his first visit to the Qualifying School. From 1982 to 2002 he finished in the top 100 on the European Order of Merit 19 out of the 21 years, with a best ranking of 17th in 1988.  In his first season, 1982, he finished joint runner-up behind Sam Torrance in the Spanish Open. After six second-place finishes on the tour, he won the 2000 Brazil Rio de Janeiro 500 Years Open on his 472nd tour start. He also won the 1988 Zimbabwe Open on the Safari Circuit and the Hassan II Golf Trophy in Morocco in 2000. He represented England in the 2000 Alfred Dunhill Cup.

In May 2012, Chapman won the Senior PGA Championship, one of the five senior major championships for his maiden victory on the Champions Tour. After holding a five stroke lead entering the final round, he prevailed by two over American John Cook. He won his second senior major in July 2012 at the U.S. Senior Open. He won by two strokes over Fred Funk, Bernhard Langer, Tom Lehman, and Corey Pavin. In December 2018 he won the MCB Tour Championship – Seychelles on the European Senior Tour, beating Phillip Price with an eagle 3 at the first hole of a sudden-death playoff. Earlier Tom Lehman and Miguel Ángel Martín came to the final hole needing a par-5 to tie with Chapman and Price but took 6 and 8 respectively.

Amateur wins
1979 Sunningdale Foursomes (with George Will), English Amateur
1981 Lake Macquarie Amateur, Lytham Trophy

Professional wins (7)

European Tour wins (1)

European Tour playoff record (1–2)

Safari Circuit wins (1)

Other wins (2)
1990 J. P. McManus Pro-Am (shared with Neil Hansen)
2000 Hassan II Golf Trophy

Champions Tour wins (2)

European Senior Tour wins (3)

<small>*Note: The 2018 MCB Tour Championship – Seychelles was shortened to 48 holes due to bad weather.</small>

European Senior Tour playoff record (1–1)

Results in major championshipsNote: Chapman never played in the Masters Tournament or the U.S. Open.CUT = missed the half-way cut (3rd round cut in 1981 Open Championship)
DQ = Disqualified
"T" = tied

Senior major championships
Wins (2)

Results timelineResults not in chronological order before 2022.''

CUT = missed the halfway cut
WD = withdrew
"T" indicates a tie for a place
NT = No tournament due to COVID-19 pandemic

Team appearances
Amateur
St Andrews Trophy (representing Great Britain and Ireland): 1980 (winners)
European Amateur Team Championship (representing England): 1981 (winners)
Walker Cup (representing Great Britain & Ireland): 1981

Professional
Alfred Dunhill Cup (representing England): 2000

References

External links

English male golfers
European Tour golfers
European Senior Tour golfers
PGA Tour Champions golfers
Winners of senior major golf championships
Kenyan emigrants to the United Kingdom
White Kenyan people
People from Nakuru County
People from Ascot, Berkshire
1959 births
Living people